Fayetteville is a census-designated place and unincorporated community in Talladega County, Alabama, United States. Its population was 1,284 as of the 2010 census.

The following is found on a sign erected by the Alabama Historical Association:

"In 1814, Tennessee Troops joined Andrew Jackson's force which won the Creek Indian War.  After Indian removal in 1836, these veterans brought their families here, named this community for their old home in Tennessee.  Fayetteville Academy was built in 1850."

In 1920, a new high school was built in the Fayetteville community called Fayetteville High School.

Demographics

References

Census-designated places in Talladega County, Alabama
Census-designated places in Alabama
Unincorporated communities in Talladega County, Alabama
Unincorporated communities in Alabama